Sanjerwas is a village in the Charkhi Dadri district of the Indian state of Haryana. Sanjarwas village is situated near the Charkhi Dadri-Kalanur State Highway. It lies approximately 16 km away from the district headquarters in the town of Charkhi Dadri.

Approximately 25 km from Bhiwani,

Approximately 15 km from Kalanaur Kalan,

Approximately 35 km from Rohtak.

References 

Villages in Charkhi Dadri district